Emertonella is a genus of comb-footed spiders that was first described by E. B. Bryant in 1945.

Species
 it contains five species, found in Asia, Mexico, the United States, Papua New Guinea, and Argentina:
Emertonella emertoni (Bryant, 1933) (type) – USA, Mexico
Emertonella hainanica Barrion, Barrion-Dupo & Heong, 2013 – China
Emertonella serrulata Gao & Li, 2014 – China
Emertonella taczanowskii (Keyserling, 1886) – USA to Argentina. Introduced to India, Sri Lanka, China, Japan (Ryukyu Is.), New Guinea
Emertonella trachypa Gao & Li, 2014 – China

In synonymy:
E. dentata  = Emertonella taczanowskii (Keyserling, 1886)
E. floricola  = Emertonella taczanowskii (Keyserling, 1886)
E. georgiana  = Emertonella emertoni (Bryant, 1933)
E. nigripes  = Emertonella taczanowskii (Keyserling, 1886)
E. rosascostai  = Emertonella taczanowskii (Keyserling, 1886)

See also
 List of Theridiidae species

References

Araneomorphae genera
Spiders of Asia
Spiders of Central America
Spiders of North America
Spiders of South America
Theridiidae